Isaías Soriano López (born 7 June 1959) is a Mexican politician affiliated with the Institutional Revolutionary Party. He served as Deputy of the LIX Legislature of the Mexican Congress representing the State of Mexico, and previously served in the Congress of the State of Mexico.

References

1959 births
Living people
Politicians from Oaxaca
Institutional Revolutionary Party politicians
Members of the Congress of the State of Mexico
21st-century Mexican politicians
Deputies of the LIX Legislature of Mexico
Members of the Chamber of Deputies (Mexico) for the State of Mexico